The Central Pacific Railroad number 173 was a 4-4-0 steam locomotive built by Norris-Lancaster for the  Western Pacific Railroad in 1864. After its acquisition by Central Pacific, 173 was involved in a bad wreck, lying idle for two years before undergoing a sweeping reconstruction by the line's Sacramento Shops.  It subsequently became the prototype for the railroad's engines when the CP began constructing locomotives. The engine was successful, and more engines were built to 173's design.

In the 1950s its blueprints became the basis for a miniature railroad built by Hollywood movie studio owner and railroad enthusiast Walt Disney, who had a 1:8 replica built by the studio's machine shop.  The Lilly Belle which resulted was widely copied by other "live steam" hobbyists, and became the basis for the future Disneyland theme park's miniature railroad's engine, the C. K. Holliday.

History
The locomotive was built in 1864 by Norris-Lancaster for the  Western Pacific Railroad, which had it designated H in keeping with its alphabetic scheme and named it the Sonoma. The engine became Central Pacific's #173 after the railroad acquired the Western Pacific in 1869. A train wreck involving CP 173 and 177 occurred at Alameda Junction on November 14, 1869, and both engines were brought to the railroad's extensive shops in Sacramento two years later.  Here, master mechanic Andrew Jackson "A.J." Stevens was given the task of rebuilding the 173. Though extensive damage was sustained from the wreck, Stevens found many of the engine's parts to be reusable, and had decided to use the 173 as a test bed for the railroad's entry into the locomotive manufacturing business. The rebuild was extensive enough that the Central Pacific listed itself as the builder in subsequent records. The rebuilt 173, finished in November 1872, was well-received by the railroad, and soon the shops produced twelve engines based on its design. Three of these were sold to other roads, among which was Virginia and Truckee Railroad's Dayton locomotive, which is the only preserved example of 173's design.  Additionally, as the railroad's existing engines (including the Jupiter, C. P. Huntington, Gov. Stanford, among others) were serviced at the shops, the names would be removed (as it had been decided not to continue naming the engines), Stevens would have their stacks, domes, and other features replaced with ones of his design—identical or similar to those of 173—thus giving the railroad's engines (as well as those of the Southern Pacific) a more unified appearance, a practice which would later be similarly employed by the Pennsylvania Railroad.

As a side note, smaller engine 177 was even more extensively rebuilt in 1873, apparently with very little (if any) of the original engine reused, and was also listed as built by Central Pacific in the records. Through the 1891 to 1901 numbering period, #173 became SP #1285, and would later become SP #1523 in 1907. The locomotive was finally scrapped in 1909, while 177 was sold to an unknown buyer in 1886.

Subsequent Builds 
Following the success of the design, twelve subsequent locomotives were constructed based on 173's drawings. They either stayed within the CP, or were sold off the other railroads, such as the  Virginia and Truckee Railroad and the Los Angeles & San Pedro Railroad. 

*Named Wilmington, number unknown, later became SP#33 after the Southern Pacific Merger, #1311 in 1891 and scrapped in 1900.

Miniature replicas

In 1939, noted railroad historian Gerald M. Best constructed a 1/2 inch (1:24) scale model of the 173 using scale drawings provided by Southern Pacific draftsman David L. Joslyn, based on specifications recovered by the latter from a warehouse of old SP records.  Best's model was built for operation at the Golden Gate International Exposition, and was placed on display in his home after the exposition ended. 

In 1948, Best's 173 model was shown to Walt Disney, who then decided to construct his own 1:8 scale model of the engine for his proposed rideable miniature railway, the Carolwood Pacific Railroad.  Drawings for Disney's model were likewise provided by Joslyn, with 173's proportions scaled down to 1.5 inches to one foot. Disney's 173, named "Lilly Belle" operated from 1950-53 on his backyard Carolwood Pacific Railroad  After the railroad was shut down, the 173 model was displayed in Disneyland's Main Street station for nearly fifty years, before moving to the new Walt Disney Family Museum, dedicated to Disney's legacy.

At the Disneyland Railroad, the No. 1 C.K. Holliday locomotive is also modeled after the 173, bearing a strong resemblance to it.

1:8 Scale models of the CP173 have become very popular with "live steamer" railroad hobbyists. In fact, most build the CP173 from castings. The most popular locomotives are made by Railroad Supply Co.

References

Central Pacific 1868 Roster of Locomotives
Central Pacific 1875 Roster of Equipment
Central Pacific 1878 Roster of Equipment
Central Pacific early 1870s record of locomotive shop work
1883 Southern Pacific Railroad Annual Report
Dunscomb, Guy (1963). A Century Of Southern Pacific Steam Locomotives

External links
Central Pacific Railroad Photographic History Museum
The Carolwood Pacific Historical Society
Walt Disney Exhibition, Walt's engine in the California State Railroad Museum as part of a traveling exhibit of Walt's railfan legacy.

4-4-0 locomotives
Scrapped locomotives
Southern Pacific Railroad locomotives
Standard gauge locomotives of the United States
Railway locomotives introduced in 1863
Norris locomotives